Vladimír Šimůnek (January 10, 1928 – 5 October 2008) was a Czechoslovakian cross-country skier who competed in the 1950s. He finished 47th in the 18 km event at the 1952 Winter Olympics in Oslo.

References

External links
18 km Olympic cross country results: 1948-52
Vladimír Šimůnek's profile at Sports Reference.com

Olympic cross-country skiers of Czechoslovakia
Cross-country skiers at the 1952 Winter Olympics
Czech male cross-country skiers
Czechoslovak male cross-country skiers
2008 deaths
1928 births